P70 may refer to:

Automobiles 
 AWZ P70 Zwickau, a small East German car 
 De Tomaso P70, an Italian sports racing car
 Toyota Starlet (P70), a Japanese car

Aviation 
 Douglas P-70 Nighthawk, an American fighter aircraft
 Paratech P70, a Swiss paraglider
 Pottier P.70, a French sport aircraft

Other uses 
 
 FB P-70, a Polish pistol
 IBM PS/2 P70, a portable computer
 P-70 Ametist, a Soviet submarine-launched missile
 P-70 radar, a Soviet early warning radar
 P70 road (Ukraine), now Highway H33
 P70-S6 Kinase 1
 Papyrus 70, a biblical manuscript
 ThinkPad P70, a laptop
 P70, a state regional road in Latvia